The 2021 Meerbusch Challenger was a professional tennis tournament played on clay courts. It was the eighth edition of the tournament which was part of the 2021 ATP Challenger Tour. It took place in Meerbusch, Germany, between 9 and 15 August 2021.

Singles main draw entrants

Seeds

 1 Rankings as of 2 August 2021.

Other entrants
The following players received wildcards into the singles main draw:
  Shintaro Mochizuki
  Rudolf Molleker
  Mats Rosenkranz

The following players received entry from the qualifying draw:
  Duje Ajduković
  Jesper de Jong
  Nick Hardt
  Nicolás Kicker

The following player received entry as a lucky loser:
  Nerman Fatić

Champions

Singles 

  Marcelo Tomás Barrios Vera def.  Juan Manuel Cerúndolo 7–6(9–7), 6–3.

Doubles 

  Szymon Walków /  Jan Zieliński def.  Dustin Brown /  Robin Haase 6–3, 6–1.

References

Meerbusch Challenger
2021
Meerbusch Challenger
August 2021 sports events in Germany